The Lickey Incline, south of Birmingham, is the steepest sustained main-line railway incline in Great Britain. The climb is a gradient of 1 in 37.7 (2.65% or 26.5‰ or 1.52°) for a continuous distance of two miles (3.2 km).

In earlier times many trains required the assistance of banking locomotives with associated logistical considerations to ensure that the train reached the top; now only the heaviest of freight trains require such assistance.

History and geography 

A survey by Isambard Kingdom Brunel in 1832 for a line between Birmingham and Gloucester followed a longer route well to the east with a maximum 1 in 300 gradient avoiding population centres, the plan lapsed with the cost being deemed too high.  In 1836 William Moorsom was engaged on a no success - no fee to survey a suitable route; with his choice being the shortest and least cost path by avoiding high land cost population centres of Worcester, Droitwich, and Tewksbury but with the disadvantage of needing to mount the steep Lickey Incline. As some B&GR the independent engineer Joseph Locke was requested to review Moorsom's work; Locke responding that the Lickey Inline would be no more dangerous than a turnpike road on an incline and he saw no reason for an alternative route.  Brunel and George Stephenson declared it would be impractical for locomotives to work such a steep incline, however Moorsom was aware of claims of climbing prowess of American Norris engines and ordered such engines against their advice.

The Lickey opened for traffic on 17 September 1840 following the arrival of the second Norris Class A engine Boston avoiding the first, Philadelphia being a single point of failure to the operation of the incline.

It is on the railway line between Birmingham and Gloucester. The Lickey Incline is the steepest sustained adhesion-worked gradient on a British standard gauge railway.

Working of the Lickey fell to successor companies of the B&GR: the Bristol and Birmingham then Midland (MR) from 1845; The London, Midland and Scottish (LMS) from 1923; and the London Midland Region of British Railways from 1948.  The Lickey was transferred to the Western Region on 1 February 1958.  Privatisation in 1993 has seen the infrastructure fall under the remit of Railtrack to 2010 and Network Rail thereafter while Freight Operating Companies (FOC) organise banking for the relatively small proportion of heavy freights that now require it.

, the incline was electrified overhead as part of the scheme to extend electric Cross-City Line trains to a resited Bromsgrove railway station. The first electric train, composed of two Class 323 electric multiple units, ran on 20 May 2018 . Scheduled electric services started in July 2018.

Broadly the same hillside is climbed by the Tardebigge lock flight on the Worcester and Birmingham Canal.

Bankers

Steam locomotives 
To assist trains up the incline and in some cases to provide additional braking, particularly to unfitted freights, specialised banking engines were kept at Bromsgrove shed at the foot of the incline.

The first Lickey bankers were the American Norris 4-2-0s Class A Extra locomotives Philadelphia, Boston and William Gwynn delivered in May, June and December 1841 respectively. The arrival of Boston allowed operations over Lickey to commence to Croft Farm on 17 September 1841. James McConnell converted the bank engines to saddle tanks in 1842 and increased the haulage capacity up the incline to between 80 and 90 tons gross, sufficient for any train of the day. Two further Class A extra Norris engines, Niagara and New York were obtained for a bargain price of £1,100 each in May 1842 and it is suggested these may have been used as auxiliary bankers in busy times; there are also suggestions they were saddle tanked at some point. They were disposed of between 1851 and 1856. The Birmingham and Gloucester railway had 26 Norris-type engines in total of which nine were built in England, three by Benjamin Hick and Sons and six by Nasmyth, Gaskell and Company, however only the five Class A Extra type could mount the Lickey incline with a non-trivial load. English manufacturers had declined to supply.

In June 1845, a large  designed by James McConnell emerged from Bromsgrove Works and was named Great Britain.

Mostly under MR Nos. 222 and 223, they continued on banking duties until disposed of in 1860 and 1862 respectively.

The 1860s saw the Midland Railway at Derby build or rebuild four locomotives for the Lickey replacing the existing bankers.  December 1860 saw the introduction of two  locomotives, Nos. 222 and 320 (later 220), which were to last until the 1890s.  An  No. 223 was constructed in 1862 and Great Britain was rebuilt to match that locomotive in 1863 and withdrawn in 1928 (as LMS 1607) and 1901 respectively.

1377 Class 1Fs, and later 2441 Class 0-6-0Ts were used on the route.

In 1919, the specialised 0-10-0 No. 2290, known as the "Lickey Banker" and nicknamed "Big Bertha", was introduced to complement the existing 0-6-0Ts. This locomotive was withdrawn in 1956 and replaced by BR standard class 9F No. 92079, which acquired the 0-10-0's headlight. Other 9Fs (including 92129, 92135, 92205, 92223, 92230, 92231 and 92234) would deputise for 92079 whenever it needed repairs.

The LNER Class U1 Garratt was also tried out unsuccessfully in 1949–1950 and again in 1955. On one occasion it was banking a train hauled by LMS Garratt No. 47972 which stalled on the bank and was rescued by "Big Bertha", resulting in the formation of a train with nineteen driving axles.

The Lickey was transferred to the Western Region in 1958 and the 3F tanks were replaced by GWR 9400 Class pannier tanks.  GWR 5205 Class -No. 5226 was used from May 1958 for two years while a trial with GWR 7200 Class  No. 7235 on 18 April 1958 was abandoned after its cylinders failed to clear platform edges.

On 7 October 1965 Great Western Hall number 6947 Helmingham Hall was sent to Bromsgrove to replace a derailed English Electric Type 3 (D6939), becoming the last steam locomotive to bank on the Lickey Incline under BR.

Diesel locomotives 

Steam was replaced by Class 37s, working in pairs.  Other classes that appeared include Hymeks. The Hymeks allocated to Lickey banking duties were modified so that the lowest transmission ratio was inoperative, despite the requirement for high tractive effort. The reason for this modification was that the typical speed of a train ascending the bank was approximately that at which the transmission would change between first and second gear, and so it tended to "hunt" between the two. The repeated gear changes under full power caused excessive wear and damage, and the simplest way to avoid the problem was to lock first gear out of action, so the locomotives used only second gear and upwards.

First-generation diesel multiple units were somewhat underpowered and climbed the bank often at little above walking pace, especially as they aged; it was not unknown for them to need to be rescued by a banker. The more powerful modern DMUs negotiate the line with little speed reduction, though there remain rules that at least half of the engines of a Class 220 or 221 must be working in order to ascend. Regular banking of passenger trains ceased in the summer of 1988 when the Bristol to Scotland sleeper was modified to have two portions from Poole and Plymouth joining at Birmingham. Many current freight trains still need to be banked however and since 2003 DB Cargo UK use dedicated Class 66 locomotives, nos. 66055-057 and 66059,(and formerly 66058).  These are modified with air-released swing-away buckeye couplers and a downward facing light to assist nighttime buffering up.

Operation in steam days

In the early days banking was performed by a pilot engine attaching to the front of the train, with rear banking only in emergency.  Reason included the use of dummy rather sprung buffers, the Norris Class A Extras have adaptations to increase the adhesive weight under load.  At the top the banking pilot would slip away from the train engine which would slack off power and allow the pilot to draw ahead by 30 yards and be directed into a siding with the policeman then resetting the points for the train to continue on the main line.  From May 1842 after the Norris engines were saddletanked they operated all trains up and down the Lickey themselves with train engines being detached and remaining either at the North or South end of the incline.  Rear banking was adopted later.

The bankers would stand in a siding on the up side to the south. The load of each train would be telegraphed from Cheltenham.

If the driver decided he needed more bankers than the table provided for him, he would whistle approaching Stoke Works signal box: a short whistle, pause, and a number of shorts indicating the number of bankers he wanted. (The 0-10-0 banker "Big Bertha" and the 9F 2-10-0's all counted as two.)

He stopped at a marker  to the rear of Bromsgrove Station up home signal, or further up if necessary to clear the crossover by which the bankers moved on to the back of his train. They were not coupled to his train or to each other. When he was in position each banker gave two crow whistles, and the train driver gave two crows in reply. Then he gave one long whistle and all of them opened their regulators.

At the top the bankers kept pushing through Blackwell station and then shut off in turn, keeping well apart, then crossed over to the down line and closed up ready to return.

To speed things up at busy times, Blackwell down advance starter signal had a 'calling-on' arm, which allowed the bankers to return downhill 'on visual' while the section to Bromsgrove was still occupied by a descending train.

Loose-coupled freight trains had to stop at the top to apply wagon brakes and not exceed .

References

Notes

Footnotes

Sources

Further reading

External links

 www.lickeyincline.co.uk – Lickey Incline Preserved Rail Resources
 - Lickey Archive Photobook – Sister site to lickeyincline.co.uk exclusively for photographs from all eras

Rail transport in Worcestershire
Railway inclines in the United Kingdom